Demolition ball may refer to:
 Whirlyball
 A wrecking ball